Butylitsy is a rural locality (a selo) and the administrative center of Butylitskoye Rural Settlement, Melenkovsky District, Vladimir Oblast, Russia. The population was 1,171 as of 2010. There are 10 streets.

Geography 
Butylitsy is located 24 km north of Melenki (the district's administrative centre) by road. Dubrovka is the nearest rural locality.

References 

Rural localities in Melenkovsky District
Melenkovsky Uyezd